This is part of a list of students of music organized by teacher.

G

Andrea Gabrieli

Giovanni Gabrieli

Domenico Gabrielli

Kenneth Gaburo

Niels Gade

Tommaso Gaffi

Ercole Gaibara

Ivan Galamian

Paolo Gallico

Raymond Gallois-Montbrun

Jean Gallon

Noël Gallon

Charles Henry Galloway

Baldassare Galuppi

Johann Baptist Gänsbacher

Eugenie Garcia

Gustave Garcia

Manuel García, Jr.

Manuel García, Sr.

Ramón Gargallo

Carlota Garriga

Francesco Gasparini

Philippe Gaubert

Pierre Gaviniès

Heinrich Gebhard

André Gedalge

Henry Geehl

Francesco Geminiani

Harald Genzmer

Friedrich Gernsheim

Roberto Gerhard

François-Auguste Gevaert

Giorgio Federico Ghedini

Vittorio Giannini

Reine Gianoli

Christopher Gibbons

Walter Gieseking

Alfred Mouledous
Yasuko Nakayama

Eugène Gigout

Anthony Gilbert

Georges Gillet

Alberto Ginastera

Tommaso Giordani

Narcisse Girard

Helen Glatz

Alexander Glazunov

Frederick Grant Gleason

Reinhold Glière

Mikhail Glinka

Christoph Willibald Gluck

Walter Gmeindl

Benjamin Godard

John Godfrey 

 Ann Cleare

Alexander Goehr

Composers

Musicologists

Percy Goetschius

Johann Gottlieb Goldberg

Alexander Goldenweiser

Friedrich Goldmann

Rubin Goldmark

Boris Goldovsky

Robert Goldsand

Harris Goldsmith

Katharine Goodson

Léon Goossens

Henryk Górecki

Sascha Gorodnitzki

John Goss

François-Joseph Gossec

Louis Moreau Gottschalk

Charles Gounod

N. Govindarajan

Hermann Grabner

Hermann Graedener

Joseph Graetz

Guillermo Graetzer

Gary Graffman

Percy Grainger

Enrique Granados

Giuseppina Grassini

Johann Gottlieb Graun

Thomas Greatorex

Gaetano Greco

Maurice Greene

André Grétry

Edvard Grieg

Gérard Grisey

Ernst Gröschel

Gabriel Grovlez

Georg Wilhelm Gruber

Jakob Grün

Gaetano Guadagni

Gioseffo Guami

Pelle Gudmundsen-Holmgreen

Alberto Guerrero

Francisco Guerrero

Pedro Guerrero

Alexandre Guilmant

Ernest Guiraud

Friedrich Gulda

Eugen Gura

H

Alois Hába

François Habeneck

Franz Habermann

Parashkev Hadjiev

Howard Hadley

Patrick Hadley

Georg Hahn

Andre Hajdu

 Chaya Czernowin

Aharon Razel
Yonatan Razel

Fromental Halévy

Rodolfo Halffter

Karel Halíř

Richard Hall

Charles Hallé



Bengt Hambraeus

Eero Hämeenniemi

Anton Joseph Hampel

 (Jan Václav Stich)

George Frideric Handel

J. N. Hanff

Ilmari Hannikainen

Wilhelm Hanser

Howard Hanson

Raymond Hanson

John Harbison

Roy Harris

William Henry Harris

Julius Harrison

Lou Harrison

Sidney Harrison

Margaret Harshaw

Laura Aikin

Shirley Close
Vinson Cole
Jane Dutton

Joseph Frank
Colenton Freeman
Franz Grundheber

Kevin Langan
Emily Magee
Nancy Maultsby

Laura Brooks Rice
Nadine Secunde
Christopher Shauldenbrand
Alma Jean Smith

Michael Sylvester
Benita Valente
Christine Weidinger
Sally Wolf

Johan Peter Emilius Hartmann

Jonathan Harvey

Kunihiko Hashimoto

Johann Adolph Hasse

Alphonse Hasselmans

Roman Haubenstock-Ramati

Josef Matthias Hauer

Carl August Haupt

Moritz Hauptmann

Robert Hausmann

Fumio Hayasaka

Walter Battison Haynes

Joseph Haydn

Michael Haydn

 (assumed)

Hugo Heermann

Bernhard Heiden

Jascha Heifetz

 Endre Granat

Johann David Heinichen

Paavo Heininen

John Heiss

Stephen Heller

Georg Hellmesberger, Sr.

Joseph Hellmesberger, Jr.

Joseph Hellmesberger, Sr.

Mara Margaret Helmuth

Heinrich Henkel

Pierre Henry

George Henschel

Adolf von Henselt

Hans Werner Henze

Philip Herschkowitz

Johann Wilhelm Hertel

Richard Hervig

Henri Herz

Norman Herzberg

Rogier de Hesdin

Willy Hess

Adolf Friedrich Hesse

Barbara Hesse-Bukowska

Richard Heuberger

William Hibbard

Edward Burlingame Hill

Ferdinand Hiller

Johann Adam Hiller

Lejaren Hiller

Paul Hindemith

Grete Hinterhofer

Kozaburo Hirai

Rozalie Hirs

Joseph Hislop

Jacob Hochbrucker

Carl Höckh

Sydney Hodkinson

K. David van Hoesen

Finn Høffding

Cynthia Hoffmann

Paul Hofhaimer

Josef Hofmann

York Höller

Robin Holloway

Vagn Holmboe

Edward Holmes

Henry Holmes

William Henry Holmes

Gustav Holst

Adriana Hölszky

 (1978)
 (1967)
 (1973)
 (1976)

 (1968)
 (1977)
 (1979)

Simon Holt

Ignaz Holzbauer

Gottfried August Homilius

Louis Homilius

Arthur Honegger

Edward John Hopkins

J. L. Hopkins

Camillo Horn
Also known as Kamillo Horn.

Charles Edward Horn

Charles Frederick Horn

Jan Hornziel

Joseph Horovitz

Vladimir Horowitz

Mieczysław Horszowski

Alan Hovhaness

 (1927–2019)
 (1930–1999)
 (1927-2020)
 (b. 1931)
 (1925–1983)
 (1947-2019)
 (1933–2012)
 (1923–2011)
 (1927–2014)

Dorothy Howell

Herbert Howells

Robert Spearing

Joan Trimble

Jan Hřímalý

Jenő Hubay

Klaus Huber

 Younghi Pagh-Paan

Bronisław Huberman

Edwin Hughes

Candelario Huizar

Johann Nepomuk Hummel

Engelbert Humperdinck

Karel Husa

Ernest Hutcheson

Brenda Hutchinson

Lee Hyla

I

Konstantin Igumnov

Akira Ifukube

Tomojirō Ikenouchi

Andrew Imbrie

ˌ

Marc'Antonio Ingegneri

John Ireland

Heinrich Isaac

Mikhail Ippolitov-Ivanov

Jean Eichelberger Ivey

J

Gordon Jacob

Frederick Jacobi

Simon E. Jacobsohn

Salomon Jadassohn

Hyacinthe Jadin

Alfred Jaëll

Philip James

Leoš Janáček

Giuseppe Jannacconi

Philipp Jarnach

Józef Jarzębski

Hanns Jelinek

John Jenkins

Donald Jenni

Knud Jeppesen

Karel Boleslav Jirák

Joseph Joachim

Ben Johnston

Niccolò Jommelli

Philly Joe Jones

Richard Jones

Mihail Jora

Rafael Joseffy

Paul Juon

References
Citations

Sources

 
 
 Gann, Kyle (1997). American Music in the Twentieth Century. Schirmer. .
 Green, Janet M. & Thrall, Josephine (1908). The American history and encyclopedia of music. I. Squire.
 Greene, David Mason (1985). Greene's Biographical Encyclopedia of Composers. Reproducing Piano Roll Fnd.. .
 Griffiths, Paul (2011). Modern Music and After. Oxford University Press. .
 Highfill, Philip H. (1991). A Biographical Dictionary of Actors, Actresses, Musicians, Dancers, Managers, and Other Stage Personnel in London, 1660–1800: S. Siddons to Thrnne, p. 234. SIU Press. .
 Hinkle-Turner, Elizabeth (2006). Women Composers and Music Technology in the United States: Crossing the Line. Ashgate Publishing. .
 Hinson, Maurice (2001). Music for More than One Piano: An Annotated Guide. Indiana University Press. .
 Jones, Barrie; ed. (2014). The Hutchinson Concise Dictionary of Music. Routledge. .
 Mason, Daniel Gregory (1917). The Art of Music: A Comprehensive Library of Information for Music Lovers and Musicians. The National Society of Music. . ( Related books via Google).
 McGraw, Cameron (2001). Piano Duet Repertoire: Music Originally Written for One Piano, Four Hands. Indian University. .
 New Grove. 
 
 
 Sadie, Julie Anne & Samuel, Rhian; eds. (1994). The Norton/Grove Dictionary of Women Composers. W. W. Norton & Company. .
 Saxe Wyndham, Henry & L'Epine, Geoffrey; eds. (1915). Who's who in Music: A Biographical Record of Contemporary Musicians. I. Pitman & Sons.
 Wier, Albert Ernest (1938). The Macmillan encyclopedia of music and musicians. Macmillan.

Students by teacher